The following is a list of events affecting Canadian television in 2016. Events listed include television show debuts, finales, cancellations, and channel launches, closures and rebrandings.

Events

Notable events

January

February

March

April

May

June

August

September

Television programs

Programs debuting in 2016
Series currently listed here have been announced by their respective networks as scheduled to premiere in 2016. Note that shows may be delayed or cancelled by the network between now and their scheduled air dates.

Programs ending in 2016
Series currently listed here have been announced by their respective networks as scheduled to premiere in 2016. Note that shows may be delayed or cancelled by the network between now and their scheduled air dates.

Networks and services

Closures

Television stations

Network affiliation changes

See also
 2016 in Canada
 List of Canadian films of 2016

References